Palatine foramen may refer to:
 Greater palatine foramen
 Lesser palatine foramen